Methyl ethyl ketone peroxide (MEKP) is an organic peroxide with the formula [(CH3)(C2H5)C(O2H)]2O2. MEKP is a colorless oily liquid.  It is widely used in vulcanization (crosslinking) of polymers.

It is derived from the reaction of methyl ethyl ketone and hydrogen peroxide. Several products result from this reaction including a cyclic dimer. The linear dimer, the topic of this article, is the most prevalent. and this is the form that is typically quoted in the commercially available material.

Solutions of 30 to 40% MEKP are used in industry and by hobbyists as catalyst to initiate the crosslinking of unsaturated polyester resins used in fiberglass, and casting. Benzoyl peroxide can be used for the same purpose.

Safety
Whereas acetone peroxide is a white powder at STP, MEKP is slightly less sensitive to shock and temperature, and more stable in storage. 

MEKP is a severe skin irritant and can cause progressive corrosive damage or blindness.

Notes

External links

CDC - NIOSH Pocket Guide to Chemical Hazards
The Register: Mass murder in the skies: was the plot feasible?
New York Times: Details Emerge in British Terror Case
The Free Information Society: HMTD Synthesis 
How MEKP cures Unsaturated Polyester Resin (video animation)

Liquid explosives
Ketals
Organic peroxides
Radical initiators
Organic peroxide explosives